MS Stord is a Norwegian car/passenger ferry that has operated on various routes between the numerous islands of Hordaland county since 1970.

Ship history
The vessel was built at the Hatlø Verksted yard in Ulsteinvik in 1970 for the Hardanger Sunnhordlandske Dampskipsselskap ("Hardanger-Sunnhordland Steamship Company"). After operating as Stord from 1970, it was renamed Fusa I in 1986, and to Fusa in 1987. In 2006 HSD merged with Gaia Trafikk forming a new company called Tide. The company ferry section changed its name to Norled in 2012.

See also

 Transport in Norway

References

 

1970 ships
Ships built in Ulstein
Ferries of Norway